The following is a list of notable events and releases of the year 1917 in Norwegian music.

Events

Deaths

Births

Fewbruary
 18 – Eva Gustavson, operatic contralto (died 2009).

 April
 20 – Eva Prytz, operatic soprano (died 1987).

 July
 15 – Reidar Andresen, popular singer and composer (born 2000).

 August
 4 – Ragnar Danielsen, pianist, composer, music arranger, and band leader (died 1976).

 September
 9 – Maj Sønstevold, composer and music teacher (died 1996).

 December
 22 – Hans W. Brimi, farmer, fiddler, and traditional folk music performer (died 1998).

See also
 1917 in Norway
 Music of Norway

References

 
Norwegian music
Norwegian
Music
1910s in Norwegian music